Dolichognatha albida is a species of spider in the family Tetragnathidae, found in Sri Lanka and Thailand.

References

Tetragnathidae
Spiders of Asia
Spiders described in 1895